Vauxia is an extinct genus of demosponge that had a distinctive branching mode of growth. Each branch consisted of a network of strands. Vauxia also had a skeleton of spongin (flexible organic material) common to modern day sponges. Much like Choia and other sponges, Vauxia fed by extracting nutrients from the water.

Vauxia is named after Mount Vaux, a mountain in Yoho National Park, British Columbia. It was first described in 1920 by Charles Doolittle Walcott.

Vauxia fossils are found in North America, specifically in the United States and Canada.

References

External links 
 
 Fauna and Flora of the Burgess Shale

Verongimorpha
Prehistoric sponge genera
Paleozoic sponges
Paleozoic life of British Columbia
Burgess Shale sponges
Maotianshan shales fossils
Cambrian first appearances
Silurian extinctions
Taxa named by Charles Doolittle Walcott
Fossil taxa described in 1920
Fossils of Canada
Fossils of Greenland
Fossils of the United States

Cambrian genus extinctions